Woodson USD 366 is a public unified school district headquartered in Yates Center, Kansas, United States.  The district includes the communities of Yates Center, Neosho Falls, Piqua, Cookville, Durand, Vernon, and nearby rural areas.

Schools
The school district operates the following schools:
 Yates Center High School.
 Yates Center Elementary School (which includes elementary school and middle school).

See also
 Kansas State Department of Education
 Kansas State High School Activities Association
 List of high schools in Kansas
 List of unified school districts in Kansas

References

External links
 

School districts in Kansas
Woodson County, Kansas